This is a list of sex workers who were murdered in the United Kingdom.

19th century

1900 – 1909

1910 – 1919

1920 – 1929

1930 – 1939

1940 – 1949

1950 – 1959

1960 – 1969

1970 – 1979

1980 – 1989

1990 – 1999

2000 – 2009

2010 – 2019

Serial murderers
 Alun Kyte (Midlands Ripper)
 Anthony Hardy (Camden Ripper)
 Gordon Cummins (Blackout Ripper)
 David Smith, acquitted of a murder of a sex worker in 1993 only to murder another in 1999
 Jack the Ripper
 Jack the Stripper
 Peter Sutcliffe (Yorkshire Ripper)
 Philip Smith
 Stephen Griffiths (Crossbow Cannibal)
 Steve Wright (Suffolk Strangler)
 Thomas Cream (Lambeth Poisoner)

See also
 English Collective of Prostitutes
 Manchester Action on Street Health
 Prostitution in the United Kingdom
 Sex Worker Advocacy and Resistance Movement
 Sex workers' rights
 UK Network of Sex Work Projects
 United Sex Workers

References

Further reading
 

Crimes against sex workers
Prostitution in the United Kingdom
Violence against sex workers in the United Kingdom
UK
Lists of victims of crimes